Kipkemboi Kimeli (November 30, 1966 – February 6, 2010) was a Kenyan long-distance runner who won the bronze medal in the 10,000 metres at the 1988 Seoul Olympics.

Kimeli died in Albuquerque, New Mexico from complications from pneumonia and tuberculosis on February 6, 2010.

Achievements

References

External links

1966 births
2010 deaths
Kenyan male long-distance runners
Athletes (track and field) at the 1988 Summer Olympics
21st-century deaths from tuberculosis
Kenyan expatriates in the United States
Olympic athletes of Kenya
Olympic bronze medalists for Kenya
Place of birth missing
Olympic bronze medalists in athletics (track and field)
Kenyan male cross country runners
Medalists at the 1988 Summer Olympics
Deaths from pneumonia in New Mexico
Tuberculosis deaths in New Mexico